The EAFF Futsal Championship is the main national futsal competition of the East Asian Football Federation nations. It was first held in 2009 and is the East Asian qualifying tournament for the AFC Futsal Championship.

Summaries

Performance by nation(s)

Medal count
As of 2022

General statistics 
As of 2019

See also
East Asian Football Championship

External links
 EAFF Futsal Championship 2009
 EAFF Futsal Championship 2013

Futsal
International futsal competitions